Waist chop or waist cutting, also known as cutting in two at the waist, was a form of execution used in ancient China. As its name implies, it involved the condemned being sliced in two at the waist by an executioner.

History
Waist chopping first appeared during the Zhou dynasty (c. 1046 BC – 256 BC). There were three forms of execution used in the Zhou dynasty: chēliè (車裂; quartering the prisoner alive), zhǎn (斬; waist chop), and shā (殺; beheading). Sometimes, the chopping was not limited to one slice.

Gao Qi, a Ming dynasty poet, was sentenced by the Hongwu Emperor to be sliced into eight parts for his politically satirical writing.

An episode not attested in the official histories recounts that in 1734, Yu Hongtu (俞鴻圖), the Education Administrator of Henan, was sentenced to a waist chop. After being cut in two at the waist, he remained alive long enough to write the Chinese character cǎn (慘; "cruel, awful") seven times with his own blood before dying. After hearing this, the Yongzheng Emperor abolished this form of execution.

In the modern Chinese language, "waist chop" has evolved to become a metaphor for the cancellation of an ongoing project, especially cancellation of television programs.

See also
 Hemicorporectomy, a surgical procedure
 Lingchi, another torturous form of execution used in China

References

 
Execution methods
Amputations